Zhenan Bao (born 1970), is the K. K. Lee Professor of Chemical Engineering at Stanford University, with courtesy appointments in Chemistry and Material Science and Engineering. She has served as the Department Chair of Chemical Engineering from 2018-2022. She is known for her work on organic field-effect transistors and organic semiconductors, for applications including flexible electronics and electronic skin.

Early life and education
Bao was born in Nanjing, China in 1970. She is the daughter of a physics and chemistry professor at Nanjing University. She studied chemistry at Nanjing University beginning in 1987. While at Nanjing University, she worked in the laboratory of Gi Xue on gold cross-linked polymers. In 1990, she moved to the United States, transferring to the University of Illinois at Chicago as she had family nearby. Several months later, Bao was accepted directly into the Ph.D. program in chemistry at the University of Chicago, without the completion of her bachelor's degree, owing to two awards she won while an undergraduate at Nanjing University.

At the University of Chicago, Bao completed her master's degree in 1993. As one of the first graduate students of Luping Yu, Bao applied palladium-catalyzed cross-coupling reactions towards the synthesis of conductive and liquid crystalline polymers. Bao graduated with her Ph.D. in 1995.

Academic career
Upon the completion of her Ph.D., Bao received an offer to join the University of California, Berkeley as a postdoctoral scholar, but instead chose to join the Materials Research Department at Lucent Technologies' Bell Labs. At Bell Labs, she developed the first all-plastic transistor, or organic field-effect transistor, which allows for use in electronic paper. It was also during this time when Jan Schön published a series of papers, two of which included Bao as a coauthor. Schön's papers were ultimately retracted due to fraud, but Bao was excused from the misconduct. She was named a Distinguished Member of Technical Staff at Bell Labs in 2001.

In 2004, she returned to academia by joining the faculty at Stanford University where she is now focusing on studying organic semiconductor and carbon nanotubes using new fabrication methods. Recent work in the lab includes developing electronic skin and all-carbon solar cells. Bao is a co-founder and on the board of directors for C3 Nano and PyrAmes Health, both of which are Silicon Valley venture-funded startup companies. She serves as an advising Partner for Fusion Venture Capital.

Research activities 
Bao and her team of researchers at Stanford University have several current projects in her research group as of 2022. Utilizing a “newly created printing method”, Bao and her team have developed skin-like integrated circuits. This new material can be used for “on-skin sensors, body-scale networks and implantable bioelectronics.” The process used for developing these materials is known as photolithography which, when combined with novel photochemistries can generate the flexible materials.

In conjunction with Karl Deisseroth, Bao has developed biocompatible polymers that can be used to “modulate the properties of target cells”. These cell-modulating biocompatible polymers alter certain properties of neurons and can either inhibit or boost neuronal firing. This technology can be used as a tool for exploration to better understand diseases such as multiple sclerosis.

Fellowships and societies

Fellowships

 American Association for the Advancement of Science
 American Chemical Society
 SPIE
 Terman Fellow, Stanford University

Advisory board positions

 ACS Nano
 Advanced Functional Materials
 Advanced Functional Materials
 Chemical Communications
 Chemistry of Materials
 Materials Today, Nanoscale
 NPG Asia Materials

Other positions

 Board of Directors, Camille and Henry Dreyfus Foundation, 2022-present.
 Advisory Council Member, Pritzker School of Molecular Engineering, University of Chicago, 2022-present.
 Science Committee member, Future Science Prize of China, 2018-2021.
 Board member, National Academies Board on Chemical Sciences and Technology, 2009-2012.
 Board of Directors, Materials Research Society, 2003-2005.
 Executive Committee Member/Member-at-Large, Polymers Materials Science and Engineering division of the American Chemical Society, 2000-2006, 2009-2012

Awards and honors 
 2000: Named among Top 100 Young Engineers by U.S. National Academy of Engineering.
 2000: Listed among Top 10 Research Breakthroughs for work on large scale integrated circuits based on organic materials, Science Magazine.
 2001: Awarded R&D 100 Award for the work on Printed Plastic Circuits for Electronic Paper Displays by R&D Magazine
 2001: Editor's Choice of the "Best of the Best" in new technology by R&D Magazine. 
 2002: ACS Team Innovation Award.
 2003: Named Among Top 100 young innovators for this century by MIT Technology Review.
 2003: University Relations of Lucent Technologies Best Mentor Award.
 2004: 3M Faculty Award.
 2004–2005: Robert Noyce Faculty Scholar.
 2009: Awarded Beilby Medal and Prize for her contributions and discoveries in the field of organic semiconductors.
 2011: ACS Cope Scholar Award.
 2013: Named one of MIT Technology Review's TR35 and C&EN 12 rising stars for her work with organic semiconductors.
 2015: Named one of Nature's 10 "people who mattered" in science for her work with wearable electronics, including artificial skin that mimics touch sense.
 2016: Elected as a member into the U.S. National Academy of Engineering.
 2017: Laureate of L'Oréal-UNESCO Awards for Women in Science for her contribution to the development of novel functional polymers for consumer electronics, energy storage and biomedical applications.
 2017: ACS Award in Applied Polymer Science "for pioneering work on the design, processing, and applications of polymer electronic materials for flexible and stretchable electronics."
 2020: Willard Gibbs Award.
 2021: Elected to American Academy of Arts and Sciences.
 2021: Awarded ACS POLY Charles G. Overberger International Prize for Excellence Polymer Research.
 2021: Awarded MRS Mid-Career Award.
 2021: Awarded AICHE Alpha Chi Sigma Award for Chemical Engineering Research.
 2021: Awarded Alumni Professional Achievement Award by the Alumni Board of the University of Chicago.
 2022: Awarded ACS Chemistry of Materials Award.
 2022: Awarded the VinFuture Prize in Female Innovator category for the development of electronic skins.

Personal life
One of her major mentors was Elsa Reichmanis who was the department director at Bell Labs. She is married and has two children.

References

External links 
Stanford Academic Bio
Bao Lab website
Interview with Chemical Technology

1970 births
20th-century Chinese engineers
20th-century women engineers
21st-century Chinese engineers
21st-century women engineers
Chinese chemical engineers
Chinese materials scientists
Chinese women engineers
Chinese engineers
Chinese women chemists
Chinese chemists
Living people
Place of birth missing (living people)
Stanford University School of Engineering faculty
University of Chicago alumni
Bell Labs
Educators from Nanjing
L'Oréal-UNESCO Awards for Women in Science laureates
Engineers from Jiangsu
Chinese emigrants to the United States
American women chemists
American women engineers
American materials scientists
Chemists from Jiangsu
21st-century American women